The men's team time trial event was part of the road cycling programme at the 1992 Summer Olympics.  The time for the team was stopped after the third person on the team crossed the finish line. This event was discontinued after this Olympics.  The race was contested over

Results

Notes
DNF – did not finishDNS – did not start

References

External links
Official Reports of 1992 Olympics

Men's time trial team
Oly
Cycling at the Summer Olympics – Men's team time trial
Men's events at the 1992 Summer Olympics